Badr Zaki is a Moroccan footballer. He usually plays as midfielder. Zaki is currently attached to Union Aït Melloul.

References

Moroccan footballers
1988 births
Living people
Sportspeople from Marrakesh
Kawkab Marrakech players
Ittihad Tanger players
Association football midfielders